Łysakowo may refer to the following places:
Łysakowo, Ciechanów County in Masovian Voivodeship (east-central Poland)
Łysakowo, Sierpc County in Masovian Voivodeship (east-central Poland)
Łysakowo, Warmian-Masurian Voivodeship (north Poland)